Pyr-T (N,N-tetramethylenetryptamine) is a lesser-known, possible psychedelic drug.  Pyr-T was first characterized by S. Mitzal.  Toxicity testing was later performed by Hunt and Brimblecombe, and although a lethal dosage was found in rats, a value is not given.  In the book TiHKAL (Tryptamines I Have Known and Loved), neither the dosage nor the duration are reported.

Pyr-T produces few to no effects in humans, but some behavioral changes were observed in animal tests. Very little data exists about the pharmacological properties, metabolism, and toxicity of pyr-T.

See also 
 4-HO-pyr-T
 5-MeO-pyr-T
 MPMI
 SN-22
 Tryptamine
 Psychedelics, dissociatives and deliriants

References

Psychedelic tryptamines
Pyrrolidines